Aćimović is a Serbian surname, a patronymic derived from the given name Aćim. It is spelt Ačimovič in Slovenia. It may refer to:

 Gorica Aćimović (born 1985), Bosnian-born Austrian handball player
 Jovan Aćimović (born 1948), Serbian footballer
 Milan Aćimović (1898-1945), Serbian politician
 Milenko Aćimović (born 1977), Slovenian footballer of Serb descent

Serbian surnames